Ram Babu Gurung is a Nepalese writer and director known for his work in Nepali cinema. His debut as a director was critically acclaimed 2013 film Kabaddi.

Filmography

Awards

References

External links 
 

Date of birth unknown
Living people
Nepalese film directors
Nepalese screenwriters
Year of birth missing (living people)
People from Okhaldhunga District
21st-century Nepalese screenwriters
21st-century Nepalese film directors
Gurung people